Angolan may refer to:

Something of, from, or related to Angola
Angolan people; see Demographics of Angola
Angolan culture
Angolar Creole
Something of, from, or related to the historical Bantu Kingdom of Ndongo
A resident of:
Angola, New York
Angola, Kansas

See also
List of Angolans
Languages of Angola

Angola (disambiguation)
Angolanidade ("Angolan-ness")

Language and nationality disambiguation pages